Shwe Toe (born 13 November 1960) is a Burmese dental professor who currently serves as Rector of the University of Dental Medicine, Yangon since 2015. He previously served as Rector of the University of Dental Medicine, Mandalay from 2012 to 2015.

Early life and education
Shwe Toe was born in Yangon, Myanmar on 13 November 1960. He graduated from University of Dental Medicine, Yangon in July 1984

See also
 Myanmar Dental Association
 Myanmar Dental Council
 University of Dental Medicine, Mandalay
 University of Dental Medicine, Yangon

References

Burmese dental professors
1960 births
Living people